Stefan Harlov (born 16 January 1983) is a Bulgarian footballer, currently playing for Etar Veliko Tarnovo as a midfielder.

External links

1983 births
Living people
Bulgarian footballers
First Professional Football League (Bulgaria) players
FC Montana players
FC Etar 1924 Veliko Tarnovo players
Association football midfielders